São Gonçalo do Piauí (first part, Portuguese meaning "San Goncalo of Piaui") is a municipality of the Brazilian state of Piaui. It is located at an altitude of 270 meters. The population is 5,030 (2020 est.) in an area of 150.22 km². After a plebiscite held in 1995, part of the municipality was split off and became the municipality of Santo Antônio dos Milagres.

References

Municipalities in Piauí